The Sheffield Giants are an American football team based in Sheffield, South Yorkshire, England, that competes in the BAFA National Leagues NFC 1 South, the second level of British American football. They operate from Sheffield Olympic Legacy Stadium and were formed in 2008 as the Sheffield Predators but re-branded to the Giants in 2016 in a nod to the Steel City Giants who folded in the 1980s. In 2012 they were crowned Division Two Bowl Champions after defeating the Peterborough Saxons at the Don Valley Stadium.

History
There have been a number of teams in and around the Sheffield area since the inception of American football in Britain. The Steel City Giants were formed in the 1980s but soon folded in the same era. Until 2008, The Sheffield Tomahawks junior side were the only operating club in the City before The Predators were formed and after finishing their associate period, entered the BAFANL in 2010. The Predators first season in Britball ended with a 0-10 record and finishing bottom of the National Central 2.

During this time they have achieved a degree of success, primarily running the double-wing formation, beating the Peterborough Saxons 39-33 in overtime to take home the Division 2 National Championship in 2012 at the Don Valley Stadium in their home town.

In 2014, the Predators announced a partnership with Structure Sport and Fitness Ltd, a gym in Sheffield, worth over £4000 annually.

In 2016, the club was rebranded as the Sheffield Giants after an online voting poll by supporters and the British American Football. The name change came following the teams decision to boost the appeal of the club, citing that the name "The Predators" was a negative name for attracting players from schools and universities

Logos & Uniforms
The Predators logo was a stylised lion, the team played in gold jerseys with a black trim, and black game pants. The Giants rebrand in 2017 incorporated a full kit rebrand to black helmet, sky blue jerseys and black pants. The away jersey designed by Britballerz is black with sky blue numbers.

Home field
The Giants play their home games at the Sheffield Olympic Legacy Stadium a £10 million multi-sport development, which occupies part of the site of the former Don Valley Stadium. The club also use the Sheffield Olympic Legacy Stadium as their training complex.

Youth Team
As well as the adult contact team, The Giants also operate both a flag football and youth contact team. This began in 2018 with a U16 contact team and has now grown to over 100 players at ages 7 to 19. They are currently recruiting for the non-contact U11, U14 and U17 'flag' teams, along with the U16 and U19 contact teams.  All youth teams are inclusive and are mixed gender.

Coaching staff

Roster

Team Records 
Complete records for the club under all three identities. 1986 to 1989 as Steel City Giants, 2010 to 2016 as Sheffield Predators and 2016 to present day for Sheffield Giants .

Honours
Premier - Northern Conference Winners - 1988 (as Steel City Giants)
BAFA Division Two Central - Divisional Champions - 2012 (as Sheffield Predators)
BAFA Division Two - National Conference Champions - 2012 (as Sheffield Predators)

Notes

External links
Sheffield Giants Facebook page
Sheffield Giants Twitter account

BAFA National League teams
American football teams in England
American football teams established in 2008
Sport in Sheffield
2008 establishments in England